Siarhei Karneyeu (born 24 November 1988 in Belarusian SSR) is a Belarusian amateur boxer in the Heavyweight (201 lbs limit) division who won bronze the 2011 World Amateur Boxing Championships.

Career
He won a silver medal at the 2008 European Championships in the -81 kg division.

At the 2011 World Championships, he defeated Deivi Julio, Michał Olaś (POL), Julio Castillo (ECU) and Chouaib Bouloudinat (ALG) before losing to eventual winner Oleksandr Usyk (UKR). With it, he qualified for the 2012 Olympics.

At the 2011 European Championships he lost to Johann Witt 26:28.

At the 2012 Olympics he beat Julio Castillo but lost to Teymur Mammadov.

References

External links
 
 
 

1988 births
Living people
Belarusian male boxers
Olympic boxers of Belarus
Boxers at the 2012 Summer Olympics
AIBA World Boxing Championships medalists
Heavyweight boxers
21st-century Belarusian people